Virginia State Route 784 in Prince William County, Virginia, United States is a 7.95-mile (12.79 km) secondary state highway officially named Dale Boulevard for its entire route. It is a divided highway and acts as a major northwest-southeast thoroughfare through the southeastern area of Prince William County, serving Dale City (the road's namesake) as well as the Potomac Mills community and southern Woodbridge area.

Route description

Dale City
State Route 784/Dale Boulevard begins at the SR 642 (Hoadly Road)/SR 643 (Purcell Road) intersection in northern Dale City where it continues southeast serving many residential areas and providing primary access to parks, schools, and shopping plazas in the area. SR 784 then intersects Ridgefield Road and soon Delaney Road and eventually heads south into central Dale City at the intersection with SR 640 (Minnieville Road). The road continues southeast from there and passes through more residential areas before intersecting Benita Fitzgerald Drive then Gideon Drive (which heads north towards Potomac Mills) and heading east passing the PRTC OmniRide Transit Center and forming a cloverleaf interchange with Interstate 95.

Woodbridge
After crossing I-95, SR 784 enters Woodbridge, continuing southeast and shortly intersecting with Potomac Center Boulevard, providing access north to the Sentara Northern Virginia Medical Center and the Stonebridge at Potomac Town Center shopping center, and Neabsco Mills Road, which heads south providing access to the Northern Virginia Community College Woodbridge Campus and Freedom High School. SR 784 then ends at U.S. Route 1, with continuation beyond the southeastern terminus as Rippon Boulevard heading towards the Potomac River.

Major intersections

Places along State Route 784
 Andrew Leitch Park
 Dale City Neighborhood Library
 Freedom High School
 John D. Jenkins Neighborhood Park
 Northern Virginia Community College Woodbridge Campus
 PRTC OmniRide Transit Center
 Stonebridge at Potomac Town Center

Public transportation
The Potomac and Rappahannock Transportation Commission (PRTC) operates a local bus route along SR 784/Dale Boulevard, along with two commuter lots nearby the road, the Hillendale Commuter Lot and Dale City Commuter Lot.

Dale City Independence Day Parade
Since July 4, 1970, Dale City has held a nearly  annual Independence Day parade along SR 784/Dale Boulevard from Mapledale Avenue and Queensdale Drive at Mapledale Plaza to the Center Plaza at Gemini Way near Minnieville Road. The parade usually consists of parade floats, marching bands from local schools, churches, and community groups, martial arts and cheerleading performances, and convoys of motorcycles, police cars and fire engines, and PRTC buses. For 2018, the parade had an estimated 10,000 spectators and it is considered to be the largest 4th of July parade in Virginia.

Due to the COVID-19 pandemic, the 2020 Dale City Independence Day Parade was cancelled, therefore cancelling what would have been the 50th consecutive year the parade has been held on July 4 since its first year in 1970.

References

784 Prince William County
State Route 784
State Route 784